Joseph Johnson Hart (April 18, 1859 – July 13, 1926) was a Democratic member of the U.S. House of Representatives from Pennsylvania.

Biography
Joseph J. Hart was born in Nyack, New York.  He attended the schools of Nyack and was graduated from the Charlier Institute in New York City, in 1876.  He conducted and owned City and Country, a Democratic newspaper of Nyack, until 1883, when he moved to Pike County, Pennsylvania, where he engaged in the real estate, lumber, and insurance businesses.  He served as school director of Milford, Pennsylvania.  He conducted and owned the Milford Dispatch from 1890 to 1900.

Hart was elected as a Democrat to the Fifty-fourth Congress.  He was not a candidate for renomination in 1896.  He resumed his newspaper interests in Milford.  In 1900 moved to New York City and engaged in clerical work.  He was the deputy tax commissioner of the city of New York from 1907 until his death  in Brooklyn, New York.  Interment in Oak Hill Cemetery, Nyack, N.Y.

Sources

The Political Graveyard

1859 births
1916 deaths
American newspaper executives
People from Nyack, New York
People from Milford, Pennsylvania
New York (state) Democrats
Democratic Party members of the United States House of Representatives from Pennsylvania
19th-century American politicians
19th-century American businesspeople